The New Haitian Communist Party (Marxist–Leninist) (abbr. NPCH(ML)) is an anti-revisionist Marxist–Leninist communist party in Haiti. It was founded in 2000. In a statement regarding the party's ideological foundation, the NPCH(ML) refers to the theory and practice of Karl Marx, Vladimir Lenin, Joseph Stalin and Mao Zedong.

The NPCH(ML) participates in and was a founding member of the International Coordination of Revolutionary Parties and Organizations (ICOR).

History
Under the regime of Jean-Claude Duvalier and his father François Duvalier, left-wing parties in Haiti were brutally repressed. This led to the exile of the Unified Party of Haitian Communists (PUCH) in France. The PUCH would return to Haiti after Duvalier was overthrown in 1986, but it began to disintegrate shortly afterwards, mostly due to the fall of the Soviet Union in 1989. Former party members of the PUCH and the also defunct Haitian Workers Party met in secret during the military rule of Raoul Cédras in the 1990s, but the political situation made it impossible to form a cohesive party. In 2000, after the end of military rule, the New Haitian Communist Party (Marxist–Leninist) was founded.

Ideology
The NPCH(ML) officially espouses Marxism–Leninism and Maoism. The party wishes to form links with the working class in Haiti, with the goal of educating them on their ideology and spreading a commitment to the proletarian struggle throughout the country.

References

External links
 

Communist parties in Haiti
Anti-revisionist organizations
Stalinist parties
Maoist parties
Political parties established in 2000
Political parties in Haiti
International Coordination of Revolutionary Parties and Organizations
Maoism in North America